Giuseppe Lucchese (born September 2, 1959), known as Occhi di ghiaccio (Eyes of ice), is a member of the Sicilian Mafia from the Brancaccio neighbourhood in Palermo. He was one of the favourite hitmen of the Corleonesi, headed by Totò Riina, during the Second Mafia War in 1981–83.

Lucchese and Vincenzo Puccio murdered their boss Giuseppe "Pino" Greco in 1985. Puccio replaced Greco and Lucchese became his substitute. Lucchese was given a life sentence in absentia as part of the Maxi Trial in 1987. After the killing of Puccio on May 11, 1989, Lucchese became the capo mandamento of the Ciaculli-Brancaccio mafia families.

Lucchese is suspected of being one of the accomplices in the murders of the mafiosi Stefano Bontade and Salvatore Inzerillo. He was arrested on April 1, 1990, and imprisoned for multiple murders. He received a life sentence for the murder of Carabinieri General Carlo Alberto Dalla Chiesa and the communist politician Pio La Torre both in 1982. He has been accused of 50 murders.

References 

1959 births
Living people
Sicilian mafiosi
Gangsters from Palermo
Italian people convicted of murdering police officers
20th-century Italian criminals
Italian people convicted of manslaughter
Italian people convicted of murder
People convicted of murder by Italy
Prisoners sentenced to life imprisonment by Italy
Sicilian mafiosi sentenced to life imprisonment